Rineloricaria steindachneri is a species of catfish in the family Loricariidae. It is native to South America, where it occurs in coastal rivers in northeastern Brazil. The species reaches 19 cm (7.5 inches) in standard length and is believed to be a facultative air-breather.

References 

Loricariini
Taxa named by Charles Tate Regan
Freshwater fish of Brazil
Fish described in 1904
Catfish of South America